Oncometopia is a genus of sharpshooters found in North and South America. The genus was erected by Carl Stål in 1869.

Selected species
Oncometopia hamiltoni
Oncometopia alpha
Oncometopia clarior
Oncometopia nigricans
Oncometopia orbona - broad-headed sharpshooter

References

Further reading

Cicadellidae genera
Hemiptera of North America
Insects of South America
Taxa named by Carl Stål
Proconiini